The Valea Miței or Pârâul Miței is a left tributary of the river Zalău in Romania. It flows into the river Zalău north of the city Zalău.

References

 Comitetul Județean pentru Situații de Urgență Sălaj  

Rivers of Romania
Rivers of Sălaj County